Kodoth is a village in the Kasaragod district of Kerala, India.

Transportation
Local roads have access to NH.66 which connects to Mangalore in the north and Calicut in the south. The nearest railway station is Kanhangad on Mangalore-Palakkad line. There are airports at Mangalore and Calicut.

References

External links

Villages in Kasaragod district